Rita Blumenberg (born 23 June 1936) is a West German retired pair skater.  With her husband Werner Mensching, she won the silver medal at the 1958 German Figure Skating Championships.  The pair finished 7th at the 1960 Winter Olympics and 4th at the European Figure Skating Championships in 1961.

Results
(with Mensching)

References
 Sports-Reference.com

1936 births
German female pair skaters
Figure skaters at the 1960 Winter Olympics
Olympic figure skaters of the United Team of Germany
Living people